Oread Spur is a rock spur on the south side of Tucker Glacier, 10 nautical miles (18 km) west of Crater Cirque, on which a survey station was placed at a height of 1,185 m by the New Zealand Geological Survey Antarctic Expedition (NZGSAE), 1957–58. They named it Oread (mountain nymph), which is derived from Greek mythology.

References 

Ridges of Victoria Land
Borchgrevink Coast